The 2022 Washington wildfire season officially began in March 2022. This season started quieter than normal due to unusually colder weather that kept Eastern and Southeastern Washington burning index's largely below normal into July.

Season narrative 
Monsoon-driven thunderstorm activity started several wildfires in August. It resulted in 10 homes burned and the evacuation of the town.

Smoke from the Cedar Creek Fire in central Oregon moved into Southwest Washington then the Puget Sound region on September 10; on that day Seattle recorded the worst air quality of any major city in the world.

The Bolt Creek Fire, a human-caused wildfire on the western slopes of the Cascades September 10–11, caused the closure of U.S. Highway 2 for over a week in September, and the evacuation of Skykomish, Washington. By early October the fire was 36 percent contained and continuing to spread northwards into the Wild Sky Wilderness, causing poor air quality in western Washington. Highway 2 was closed again on October 5 and October 9–10 to remove burned trees threatening road safety, and intermittent closures were expected to continue later in October.

On the weekend of October 15–16, easterly winds over the Cascades brought dry, subsiding air and record temperatures to the Puget Sound area. The weather conditions contributed to the initiation and expansion of fires on the west slopes of the Cascades, and the worst air quality of the season so far occurred in Seattle that weekend. Fires included the Nakia Creek Fire in Southwest Washington and one on private timberland near Loch Katrine in the Alpine Lakes Wilderness 30 miles east of Seattle. Flames from the Loch Katrine fire could be seen from Seattle.

On October 18 and 19, due to wildfire smoke, Seattle had the worst air quality of any major city in the world.

List of wildfires

It may not be complete or reflect the most recent information. Costs are in 2022 USD.

Further reading

References

External links
 Washington wildfires Washington State Department of Natural Resources

Wildfires
2022
2022 Washington (state) wildfires
2022 meteorology